The Junior men's race at the 1986 IAAF World Cross Country Championships was held in Colombier, Neuchâtel, Switzerland, at the Planeyse Colombier on March 23, 1986.   A report on the event was given in The Herald and in the Evening Times.

Complete results, medallists, and the results of British athletes were published.

Race results

Junior men's race (7.75 km)

Individual

Teams

Note: Athletes in parentheses did not score for the team result

Participation
An unofficial count yields the participation of 172 athletes from 34 countries in the Junior men's race, one athlete less than the official number published.

 (5)
 (6)
 (5)
 (5)
 (6)
 (2)
 (2)
 (6)
 (6)
 (6)
 (6)
 (6)
 (6)
 (1)
 (6)
 (1)
 (6)
 (6)
 (5)
 (6)
 (6)
 (2)
 (5)
 (6)
 (6)
 (6)
 (4)
 (6)
 (5)
 (6)
 (5)
 (6)
 (6)
 (5)

See also
 1986 IAAF World Cross Country Championships – Senior men's race
 1986 IAAF World Cross Country Championships – Senior women's race

References

Junior men's race at the World Athletics Cross Country Championships
IAAF World Cross Country Championships
1986 in youth sport